Harry Child was a baseball player.

Harry Child may also refer to:

Harry W. Child, entrepreneur
Harry Child, actor in Love Never Dies (musical)

See also
Harry Childs (disambiguation)